Femke Hermans is a Belgian professional boxer. She held the WBO female super-middleweight title in 2018, becoming the second Belgian woman to hold a major world championship, and also challenged for the WBA female super-middleweight title and unified WBA, WBC, and IBF female middleweight titles in 2018.

Professional career
Hermans made her professional debut on 23 January 2016, scoring a six-round unanimous decision (UD) victory against Galina Gyumliyska at the Sportloods Waarborre in Asse, Belgium.

After a technical knockout (TKO) victory against Vladislava Lopuhova in June, Hermans defeated Elene Sikmashvili via second-round knockout (KO) on 8 October, capturing the inaugural Belgian and vacant BeNeLux female super-middleweight titles in Middelkerke, Belgium.

In her next fight she faced Borislava Goranova for the WBF International female super-middleweight title on 21 January 2017,  at the Sportloods Waarborre. Hermans captured the title via eight-round UD, with two judges scoring the bout 80–72 and the third judge scored it 79–73.

Two fights later she challenged for her first world title, facing Alicia Napoleon for the vacant WBA female super-middleweight title on 3 March 2018, at the Barclays Center in Brooklyn, New York. The bout was televised live on Showtime as part of the undercard for Deontay Wilder vs. Luis Ortiz. Hermans suffered the first defeat of her career, losing via UD with the judges' scorecards reading 99–91, 98–92 and 98–92.

She made a second attempt at a world title in her next fight, facing Nikki Adler for the vacant WBO female super-middleweight title on 12 May 2018, at the Eisstadion in Augsburg, Germany. Hermans defeated Adler via UD to become the second Belgian woman (after Delfine Persoon) to win a major world title. One judge scored the bout 99–91 and the other two scored it 97–93.

After two UD victories in non-title fights, Hermans moved down a weight class to challenge Claressa Shields for the unified WBA, WBC, and IBF female middleweight titles on 8 December 2018, at the StubHub Center in Carson, California. In an event that served as HBO's last televised boxing show, Hermans suffered the second defeat of her career, losing via UD over ten rounds, with all three judges scoring the bout 100–90.

She moved back up to super-middleweight in her next fight, facing Elin Cederroos for the vacant IBF female title on 22 March 2019, at the Belleheide Center in Roosdaal, Belgium. Hermans suffered her second consecutive defeat, and the third of her career, losing via majority decision (MD) with two judges scoring the bout 96–94 in favour of Cederroos while the third judge scored it even at 95–95.

Following a TKO victory in a rematch with Borislava Goranova in October 2020, Hermans faced Luiza Davydova for the inaugural European female middleweight title on 5 December 2020, at the Fight Off Training Center in Wavre, Belgium. Hermans defeated Goranova via UD, with all three judges scoring the bout 98–92.

In March 2021, it was announced that Hermans would challenge WBO female middleweight champion Savannah Marshall. The bout was scheduled to take place on 10 April in England, however, two days before the bout it was announced that Hermans was forced to withdraw from the contest after one of her team members tested positive for COVID-19.

Professional boxing record

References

External links

Living people
Year of birth missing (living people)
Date of birth missing (living people)
Belgian women boxers
Middleweight boxers
Super-middleweight boxers
World super-middleweight boxing champions
World Boxing Organization champions
European Boxing Union champions